The title of Earl of Athlone has been created three times.

History 
It was created first in the Peerage of Ireland in 1692 by King William III for General Baron van Reede, Lord of Ginkel, a Dutch nobleman, to honour him for his successful battles in Ireland including the Siege of Athlone. The title also had the subsidiary title of Baron Aughrim.  These titles became extinct in 1844 upon the death of the 9th Earl. The Earls also bore the Dutch nobility title Baron van Reede (hereditary in male line; still extant in the Netherlands).

The second creation was in the Peerage of the United Kingdom, as a subsidiary title of the Dukedom of Clarence and Avondale, and was conferred in 1890 upon Prince Albert Victor of Wales, the eldest son of the Prince of Wales. When he died in 1892, the title became extinct.

The third creation was in 1917, also in the Peerage of the United Kingdom, for the former Prince Alexander of Teck, younger brother of Queen Mary and great uncle of Queen Elizabeth II, along with the subsidiary title of Viscount Trematon. The earldom was given after the Titles Deprivation Act 1917, when members of the British Royal Family were forced to renounce their German royal titles. Alexander had two sons who predeceased him, and the titles became extinct after his death.

Earls of Athlone, First Creation (1692)
Godard van Reede, 1st Earl of Athlone (1630–1703)
Frederick Christiaan van Reede, 2nd Earl of Athlone (1668–1719)
Godard Adriaan van Reede, 3rd Earl of Athlone (1716–1736)
Fredrik Willem van Reede, 4th Earl of Athlone (1717–1747)
Fredrik Christiaan Reinhart van Reede, 5th Earl of Athlone (1743–1808)
Frederik Willem van Reede, 6th Earl of Athlone (1766–1810)
Reynoud Diederik Jacob van Reede, 7th Earl of Athlone (1773–1823)
George Godard Henry van Reede, 8th Earl of Athlone (1820–1843)
Willem Gustaaf Frederik van Reede, 9th Earl of Athlone (1780–1844)

Earls of Athlone, Second Creation (1890)
Prince Albert Victor Christian Edward, 1st Duke of Clarence and Avondale, 1st Earl of Athlone (1864–1892)

Earls of Athlone, Third Creation (1917)
Alexander Augustus Frederick William Alfred George Cambridge, 1st Earl of Athlone (1874–1957)

References

Extinct earldoms in the Peerage of Ireland
Extinct earldoms in the Peerage of the United Kingdom
Earl
Noble titles created in 1692
Noble titles created in 1890
Noble titles created in 1917
1692 establishments in Ireland